Miltochrista multidentata is a moth of the family Erebidae. It was described by George Hampson in 1900. It is found on Buru in Indonesia.

References

 

multidentata
Moths described in 1900
Moths of Indonesia